Ange Didier Houon  (26 January 1986 – 12 August 2019), also known as DJ Arafat, or Arafat Muana and by various other stage names, was an Ivorian DJ and singer, who made music in the Coupé-Décalé genre. "Dosabado", "Kpangor", "Zoropoto", "Enfant Beni" and "Moto, Moto" were some of his major hits. He was popular among in French-speaking Africa. He was awarded the "best artist of the year" at the Coupé-Decalé Awards in the year 2016 and 2017.

Discography

Albums

Singles 
 2003 : "Hommage A Jonathan" (with Mulukuku DJ)
 2008 : "African Tonik" with Mokobé, Mohamed Lamine and Mory Kante
 2009 : "Gladiator"
 2010 : "Sao Tao en Lil Wayne" (with Yvan Trésor)
 2010 : "Hymne officiel des Elephants pour Orange foot"
 2010 : "Digital"
 2014 : "Gbinchin Pintin"
 2014 : "2 Matin 3 le Soir"
 2014 : "Yele Lele"
 2016 : "Agbangnan"
 2016 : "Mouvement Patata"
 2016 : "Eto'o Fils"
 2016 : "Je Gagne Temps"
 2016 : "Maplorly"
 2017 : "Enfant béni"
 2017 : "Faut Chercher Pour Toi"
 2018 : "Dosabado"
 2018 : "Tapis Vélo Afro Trap"
 2019 : "Moto Moto"
 2020 : "Kong"

Musical collaborations

References

Discographies of Ivorian artists